Franciszek Bukaty (1747–1797) was a Polish diplomat.

He was (1772–1785) Polish chargé d'affaires, and later ambassador in London.

At first the Polish King Stanisław August Poniatowski wanted to make an English lawyer John Lind Polish ambassador in London, but British authorities opposed, because it was seen as  'unpatriotic' if an Englishman represented a foreign court.

References
Zofia Libiszowska, Życie polskie w Londynie w XVIII wieku, Instytut wydawniczy "PAX", Warszawa 1972.
Zofia Libiszowska, Misja polska w Londynie w latach 1769-1795, Łódź 1966.

External links
http://www.wielcy.pl/psb/bukaty/franciszek/2406.shtml
http://encyklopedia.pwn.pl/haslo.php?id=3881789

Diplomats of the Polish–Lithuanian Commonwealth
1747 births
1797 deaths